Heuvelland is a municipality located in the Belgian province of West Flanders. The municipality comprises the villages of Dranouter, Kemmel, De Klijte, Loker, Nieuwkerke, Westouter, Wijtschate and Wulvergem. Heuvelland is a thinly populated rural municipality, located between the small urban centres of Ypres and Poperinge and the metropolitan area of Kortrijk-Lille along the E17. On 1 January 2006 Heuvelland had a total population of 8,217. The total area is 94.24 km2 which gives a population density of 87 inhabitants per km2. The name heuvelland is Dutch meaning "hill country", as the municipality is characterized by the different hills on its territory.

Geography

Landscape
The municipality is located in an area known as the West-Flemish Hills. The highest hill in Heuvelland is the Kemmelberg (156 m); followed by the Vidaigneberg (136 m), the Rodeberg (129 m), the Scherpenberg (125 m) and a lower hill in Wijtschate (82 m). On the border with France is the Zwarteberg.

Municipality parts 
The municipality Heuvelland consists of eight small rural villages. The "deelgemeentes" of Dranouter, Kemmel, Loker, Nieuwkerke, Westouter, Wijtschate and Wulvergem were independent municipalities before the merger in 1977. De Klijte wasn't independent, but was a part of Reningelst (then independent, now part of Poperinge).

Kemmel, Wijtschate, Nieuwkerke and Westouter are the largest centres, with more than 1000 inhabitants each. The town hall and municipal administration are located in Kemmel, as are the police office and post office. The rest home, municipal sports hall and main library are located in Wijtschate. The municipal container park is found in Nieuwkerke. The four other villages are smaller and accommodate less facilities.

Besides the village centres, a number of smaller residential areas are scattered on the territory. On top of the crest of the Rodeberg and Zwarteberg  small residential development, mixed with small shops, tourist businesses and restaurants are found. The city centre of Mesen also expands a little on the territory of Wijtschate in Heuvelland.

Source: Ruimtelijk structuurplan Heuvelland

Neighbouring villages and towns
Because of its relative extensiveness, the municipality of Heuvelland borders a large number of villages and towns:

a. Poperinge (city of Poperinge)
b. Reningelst  (city of Poperinge)
c. Dikkebus (city of Ypres)
d. Vlamertinge (city of Ypres)
e. Voormezele (city of Ypres)
f. Hollebeke (city of Ypres)
g. Houthem (city of Comines-Warneton)
h. Bas-Warneton (city of Comines-Warneton)
i. Warneton (city of Comines-Warneton)
j. Mesen (city of Mesen)
k. Ploegsteert (city of Comines-Warneton)
l. Nieppe (France)
m. Bailleul (France)
n. Saint-Jans-Cappel (France)
o. Boeschepe (France)

History

World War I

The area experienced many major battles during World War I, as part of the Ypres Salient area. The front-line ran through the area of Wytschaete, which was captured and held several times by both sides during the course of the war. Spanbroekmolen was an important German stronghold, and on 30 April and 17 June 1916, the area was the site of two German gas attacks on British troops at Wulverghem. The Kemmelberg was important during the Battle of the Lys, and German units maintained a trench system (Bayernwald) within view of Ypres at Croonaert Wood. Nowadays, the Bayernwald trenches can be visited as an open-air museum. There are a number of war cemeteries in the municipality, including Godezonne Farm, RE Farm, Spanbroekmolen, Suffolk, Klein Vierstraat and Kemmel Number 1 French Cemetery.

Notable people
The cartographer and astronomer Petrus Plancius was born in Dranouter in 1552.
Singer Geike Arnaert of Hooverphonic was born and raised in Westouter.

References

External links

Official website

 
Municipalities of West Flanders